Patchoulol or patchouli alcohol (C15H26O) is a sesquiterpene alcohol found in patchouli. Patchouli oil is an important material in perfumery. The (−)-optical isomer is one of the organic compounds responsible for the typical patchouli scent. Patchoulol is also used in the synthesis of the chemotherapy drug Taxol.

Structure determination
Patchouli alcohol was first isolated in 1869 by Gal and its chemical composition later correctly formulated as C15H26O by Montgolfier. During early structural investigation the presence of a saturated tricyclic tertiary alcohol was established. After several years of careful study Büchi and co-workers proposed the structure of patchouli alcohol to correspond to 1, based on degradation studies from his earlier work, verified later by synthesis of material which corresponded to the natural authentic sample of patchouli alcohol.

A serendipitous finding by Dunitz and co-workers revealed a contradictory structure. They had undertaken an X-ray analysis of the patchouli alcohol diester of chromic acid, with the objective of determining the Cr-O-C angles. In the course of their analysis they found that the X-ray evidence could not be reconciled with the proposed structure 1. Instead they proposed together with Büchi the novel structure 2. The discrepancy had resulted from an unanticipated skeletal rearrangement that had occurred in the Büchi synthesis when patchoulene was treated with peroxy acid, an operation that by accident generated the correct architecture of the natural product.

Contains embedded bicyclo[2.2.2]octane motif.

See also
Norpatchoulenol

References

External links
Chime 3D representation

Perfume ingredients
Secondary alcohols
Sesquiterpenes